The Women's under-23 time trial at the 2010 European Road Championships took place on 15 July. The Championships were hosted by the Turkish city of Ankara. The course was 25.9 km long.

Ellen van Dijk, who won in 2008 and 2009, was not able to defend her European title.

Top 10 Final classification

Source

References

2010 European Road Championships
European Road Championships – Women's U23 time trial
International cycle races hosted by Turkey
2010 in Turkish women's sport
2010
2010 in women's road cycling